Skegness Braves were a shortlived British motorcycle speedway team who operated at Skegness Stadium, in Orby, Skegness, Lincolnshire between 1997 and 1998. The team entered the Premier League (second division) in 1997. During the 1997 Premier League speedway season the team withdrew and had their results expunged. Their final home fixture was on th 7 July. The following season they failed to complete the league campaign again and withdrew after four matches in the 1998 Speedway Conference League. This time however their fixtures were completed by the Norfolk Braves.

Season summary

References

Defunct British speedway teams